Michal Tabara was the defending champion but lost in the first round to Dennis van Scheppingen. 

Guillermo Cañas won in the final 6–4, 7–6(7–2) against Paradorn Srichaphan.

Seeds

Draw

Finals

Top half

Bottom half

External links
 2002 Tata Open Draw

2002 Tata Open
Doubles
Maharashtra Open